Rabindranath Vladimir Quinteros Lara (born 31 October 1943) is a Chilean politician who currently serves as a member of the Senate of his country.

References

External links
 BCN Profile

1943 births
Living people
Chilean people
20th-century Chilean politicians
21st-century Chilean politicians
University of Chile alumni
Socialist Party of Chile politicians